Dynamic Text Document (DTXT) is file format for use in FTP servers. It was created by Zain-Tech. It is designed to use the Internet connection on a client PC to decode information in binary on the webpage provided in the file preloaded in  format. It converts the binary to text and makes the text appear in the file.

References

 

Text file formats